The Indiana Farmers Coliseum (originally Indiana State Fairgrounds Coliseum and formerly Pepsi Coliseum and Fairgrounds Coliseum) is a 6,500-seat indoor multi-use arena, located on the Indiana State Fairgrounds in Indianapolis. The Indiana Farmers Coliseum is home to both the Indy Fuel of the ECHL and the IUPUI Jaguars of the NCAA.

Originally opened in 1939 as part of President Franklin D. Roosevelt's Works Progress Administration (part of the New Deal), the Coliseum has hosted numerous historical events, including the only performances ever held in Indiana by The Beatles, in 1964.

After Market Square Arena opened in 1974, the coliseum continued on as an alternate venue to the larger arena for events requiring less seating or overall space. This continues today after the Gainbridge Fieldhouse opened in 1999, and the subsequent demolition of Market Square Arena in 2001.

On October 26, 2012, the Coliseum held a "Lights Out" ceremony and closed for renovations. On April 24, 2014, after a 17-month, $53 million renovation, the Coliseum re-opened.

In December 2014, the Indiana Farmers Mutual Insurance Company entered into a ten-year agreement with the Indiana State Fair Commission to re-christen the arena as the Indiana Farmers Coliseum.

History

1963 gas explosion

On October 31, 1963, during a Holiday on Ice show, a liquefied petroleum gas leak at a concession stand caused an explosion which killed 81 people and injured around 400 others. A memorial plaque was dedicated 40 years later in the building, but it has since been removed. Another plaque honoring the explosion victims currently hangs inside the building's lobby.

Indiana Pacers (1967–74)
The venue was home to the Indiana Pacers of the American Basketball Association (ABA) from 1967 to 1974. The Pacers were very successful in their tenure at the Coliseum, winning three ABA Championships. They captured the ABA titles in 1969–70, defeating the Los Angeles Stars in 6 games, in 1971–72, defeating the New York Nets in 6 games, and in the 1972–73 season, defeating the Kentucky Colonels in 7 games. The team moved to Market Square Arena in 1974. In 1976, the Pacers became a franchise in the National Basketball Association (NBA) when the ABA merged with the NBA.

The Pacers returned for a night when they played their first pre-season game of the 2008–09 season at the Pepsi Coliseum on October 8, 2008, hosting the then-New Orleans Hornets. 7,439 people watched the Pacers lose to the Hornets 105–71. The Pacers wore uniforms based on the 1967 to 1971 uniform design. Former ABA Pacers George McGinnis, Darnell Hillman, Bob Netolicky, Don Buse, Jerry Harkness, Steve Green, Tom Thacker, Bill Newton, and Wayne Pack, attended the game and were recognized during a halftime ceremony. During the game's first quarter, former Championship Pacers coach and current radio commentator Slick Leonard sat on the Pacers' bench as head coach, while then-head coach Jim O'Brien joined Mark Boyle for the radio broadcast.

Ice hockey

The Indianapolis Capitals of the American Hockey League played at the Coliseum from 1939 to 1952, winning the Calder Cup in 1942 and 1950. The Indianapolis Chiefs of the International Hockey League played at the Coliseum from 1955 to 1962, winning the Turner Cup in 1958. The Indianapolis Checkers of the Central Hockey League and International Hockey League played at the Coliseum from 1979 to 1985, winning back-to-back Adams Cup Championships in 1982 and 1983. The Indianapolis Ice of the International Hockey League played in the Coliseum from 1988 to 1994, and again from 1997 to 1999 when the Conseco Fieldhouse was under construction, winning the 1990 Turner Cup championship.

The Indiana Ice of the United States Hockey League played at the Coliseum from 2004 to 2012, leaving due to the renovation. The Ice won the USHL's Clark Cup in 2009 while playing in the building. They did not return to the Coliseum upon the venue reopening, opting for withdrawal from competition or dormancy until another venue could be secured. Since 2014 the Indy Fuel hockey team has played in the arena. The Fuel are an ECHL team affiliated with the Chicago Blackhawks.

The Coliseum hosted the American Hockey League's Calder Cup Final in 1942, 1943 and 1950; the International Hockey League's Turner Cup Final in 1957, 1958 and 1990; the Central Hockey League's Adams Cup Final in 1982, 1983 and 1984; and the United States Hockey League's Clark Cup Final in 2009. Eight of Indianapolis' nine hockey championship teams called the Coliseum home. The other was the 2014 Indiana Ice, who split their schedule between Bankers Life Fieldhouse and Pan Am Pavilion.

Other sports teams and events
The finals of the 1942–43 – 1944–45 Indiana High School Boys Basketball Tournaments were held at the Coliseum.

On January 25, 2019, the Horizon League announced its Men's and Women's Basketball Championships would take place at the Coliseum, starting March 9–10, 2020.

The Coliseum also hosts Budweiser Fight Night Boxing; the Indianapolis Boat, Sport & Travel Show; the Hoosier Horse Fair; high school and college commencement ceremonies; and many concerts featuring national acts. On April 27, 2016, Donald Trump held a rally for his presidential campaign in the Coliseum.

During the winter months, public ice skating is offered at the Coliseum.

With the NCAA electing to hold the entirety of the 2021 Division I men's basketball tournament within the state of Indiana to prevent the spread of COVID-19, the Coliseum served as one of the sites hosting first and second round games.

On April 13, 2021 the Indiana Fever announced that they will play the last 12 home games of the 2021 WNBA season at the Coliseum due to the renovations at Gainbridge Fieldhouse.

On November 10, 2021, professional wrestling promotion All Elite Wrestling hosted an episode of their weekly television show AEW Dynamite from the arena.

Performances
Cliff Richard & The Shadows – February 1, 1960
Tennessee Ernie Ford – August 6, 1964
The Beatles – September 3, 1964
The Dave Clark Five – November 6, 1964
The Beach Boys – December 29, 1964, with The Fantastic Four Wheels and Sir Richard & The Mark IV's, November 18, 1966, with Chad & Jeremy, The Dawn Five and The Boys Next Door, and August 26, 1982
The Rolling Stones – July 9, 1966, with The Standells and The McCoys
Perry Como – August 10, 1966
The Yardbirds – November 11, 1966
Herb Alpert & The Tijuana Brass – August 5, 1967
Herman's Hermits – September 1, 1967, with The Who
Lawrence Welk – August 12, 1968
The Cowsills – August 24, 1968
Ed Ames – August 25, 1968
Nancy Sinatra & Lee Hazlewood – September 1, 1968
The Jimi Hendrix Experience – May 11, 1969, with Chicago
Glen Campbell – August 5, 1969, with Jerry Lee Lewis, Jerry Reed and John Hartford
Anita Bryant – August 28, 1969
The Association – August 29, 1969, with The Ventures
The Byrds – February 14, 1970
Led Zeppelin – April 4, 1970
  Janis Joplin - June 6, 1970
Paul Revere & the Raiders – August 25, 1970, with Art Linkletter
The Guess Who – August 26, 1970
Johnny Cash & June Carter Cash – August 29, 1970
Buck Owens & The Buckaroos – September 5, 1970
Three Dog Night – February 27, 1971, with Uriah Heep
Neil Diamond – May 9, 1971
The Jackson 5 – May 29, 1971
Santana – June 12, 1971, with The Tower of Power
Red Skelton – August 21, 1971
Frank Zappa & The Mothers of Invention – October 19, 1971, and May 2, 1973, with the Mahavishnu Orchestra
REO Speedwagon – December 10, 1971, and April 6, 1973, with Blue Öyster Cult and Beck, Bogert & Appice
King Crimson – March 11, 1972, and April 21, 1973
Badfinger – March 28, 1972
Elvis Presley & The TCB Band – April 12, 1972
Jethro Tull – May 2, 1972
Yes – September 20, 1972, with The Eagles and Gentle Giant
Deep Purple – December 2, 1972, with Fleetwood Mac
Uriah Heep – February 27, 1973, with Spooky Tooth
The Doobie Brothers – May 13, 1973, with The Faces
The Grateful Dead – October 27, 1973
Humble Pie – December 8, 1973
Poco – May 16, 1974, with Golden Earring and Bachman–Turner Overdrive
Loggins & Messina – August 23, 1974
Styx – March 8, 1975, with Blue Öyster Cult and Babe Ruth
Foghat – May 6, 1975, and December 3, 1976
Chicago – August 22, 1975
Helen Reddy – August 24, 1975
The Electric Light Orchestra – March 11, 1976
Ted Nugent – April 9, 1976, with Rush and The Sutherland Brothers & Quiver, and August 16, 2012
Neil Sedaka – August 21, 1976
Black Oak Arkansas – October 9, 1976, with Heart
Dolly Parton – August 23, 1977, August 22, 1982, and August 18, 1989
The Robin Trower Band – October 4, 1977
Roy Rogers & Dale Evans – August 27, 1976, with The Sons of the Pioneers
The Marshall Tucker Band – August 19, 1980
Neil Young & The International Harvesters – August 19, 1985
Def Leppard – July 18, 1988
The Smashing Pumpkins – December 6, 1993
The Flaming Lips – November 5, 1994, with Candlebox and Sweet Water
Danzig – December 6, 1994
Nine Inch Nails – January 21, 1995, with Pop Will Eat Itself and The Jim Rose Circus
Billy Ray Cyrus – April 15, 1995
Queensrÿche – April 21, 1995, with Type O Negative
Primus – November 11, 1995
Green Day – November 17, 1995
Our Lady Peace – November 2, 1996
The Stone Temple Pilots – December 7, 1996
Pantera – January 12, 1997, and March 18, 2001, with Soulfly and Morbid Angel
Marilyn Manson – February 13, 1997
311 – November 18, 1997, with Sugar Ray and Incubus
The Jars of Clay – March 21, 1998
Vanilla Ice – January 19, 2001
A Perfect Circle – March 17, 2001, with Snake River Conspiracy, and April 17, 2004, with The Mars Volta
John Mayer – November 12, 2002, with Robert Randolph and the Family Band
The Honda Civic Tour – April 15, 2003
Linkin Park – December 8, 2003, with Puddle of Mudd and Ill Niño
O.A.R. – December 12, 2003
tobyMac & The Diverse City Band  – November 18, 2004
Good Charlotte – May 8, 2005
The Winter Jam Tour Spectacular – January 27, 2006
David Lee Roth – September 15, 2006
Music as a Weapon – December 15, 2006
Kenny Rogers – August 14, 2007
American Idol Live – August 16, 2007
Three Days Grace – March 22, 2008, with Breaking Benjamin, Seether and Neverest
The Casting Crowns – May 2, 2008, with Leeland and John Waller, and October 11, 2014, with Mandisa and The Sidewalk Prophets
Sugarland – August 12, 2008, with Kellie Pickler and Ashton Shepherd, and August 20, 2010, with Little Big Town
Seether – November 23, 2008, with Staind and Papa Roach
The Jägermeister Music Tour – December 22, 2008
Slipknot – February 3, 2009, with Trivium and Coheed and Cambria
In Flames – May 3, 2009
MercyMe – August 12, 2009
Heart – August 16, 2009
The Zac Brown Band – December 9 and 29, 2009, with Nic Cowan, Levi Lowrey and Sonia Leigh
The Blessid Union of Souls – January 23, 2010
Arcade Fire – April 27, 2011, with The National
Jack Ingram – August 5, 2011
VH1 Pepsi Super Bowl Fan Jam – February 2, 2012
CMT Crossroads Super Bowl Fan Jam – February 4, 2012
99.5 WZPL's Birthday Bash – June 13, 2014
Lynyrd Skynyrd – July 31, 2014, with Jamey Johnson and Drake White & The Big Fire
The Pepsi HankFest – November 2, 2014
WZPL 99.5's Jingle Jam – December 7, 2014
Zedd - 27 October 2015
The 1975 – November 16, 2016

See also

List of music venues
List of attractions and events in Indianapolis
List of indoor arenas in the United States
List of NCAA Division I basketball arenas
List of American Basketball Association arenas

References

External links

 
Photos from Indiana Ice games
Photo gallery of Pacers highlights at Coliseum
Indianapolis, IN Coliseum Explosion, Oct 1963

American Basketball Association venues
Basketball venues in Indiana
Indianapolis Ice
Indoor ice hockey venues in the United States
Sports venues in Indianapolis
Tourist attractions in Indianapolis
IUPUI Jaguars basketball
History of Indianapolis
Sports venues completed in 1939
Indy Fuel
Indoor arenas in Indiana
Boxing venues in Indiana
Ice hockey venues in Indiana
Tennis venues in Indiana
Music venues in Indiana
Indiana State Fair
1939 establishments in Indiana